Beverly Sebastian is an American film director, writer, and cinematographer whose independent films in the 1970s and 1980s were predominantly exploitation pictures similar to the work of Roger Corman and other directors in the 1960s at independent studios like American International Pictures.  Her husband, Ferd Sebastian, often co-directed with her.

After directing Running Cool in 1993, she and her husband retired to Florida. As of 2012, Sebastian runs the Greyhound Foundation which saves Greyhound dogs retired from racing, gives them medical assistance and trains them with prisoners.

Director and writer filmography

Running Cool (1993)
American Angels: Baptism of Blood (1989)
'Gator Bait II: Cajun Justice (1988)
Rocktober Blood (1984)
On the Air Live with Captain Midnight (1979)
Delta Fox (1979)
Flash and the Firecat (1975)
'Gator Bait (1974)
The Single Girls (1974)
The Hitchhikers (1972)
Red, White and Blue (1971)

References

External links
 

Living people
American film directors
American production designers
American women film directors
American women screenwriters
Place of birth missing (living people)
Year of birth missing (living people)
American women film producers
Women production designers
21st-century American women